James Malcom Green Jr. (born December 19, 1992 in Brooklyn, New York) is an American retired freestyle wrestler and graduated folkstyle wrestler who competes at 70 kilograms. His most successful year came in 2017, when he placed second at the World Championships and the World Cup and claimed the Pan American Continental Championship and the US Open National Championship, as well as other international titles. In college, Green was a four–time NCAA Division I All–American and a Big Ten Conference champion (two–time finalist) for the Nebraska Cornhuskers.

Background 
Green was born in Brooklyn, New York and raised in Willingboro Township, New Jersey by his Jamaican father and American mother, along with two sister. His father had moved to the United States as a teenager and opened up a recording studio, where he helped upcoming music talent. In 2003, when James was 10 years of age, Green's father was shot and killed by one of the people he helped, whom he was arguing with about studio fees and money for rent. Green was shown wrestling by his father, who was also a beginner, and was motivated to continue in the sport despite the passing of the latter by Bob Acosta, a friend of Green Sr, who would drive him out of town to train and compete as the wrestling community was not big in South Jersey. Green's story was featured in the FloFilm "Who is James Green?".

Folkstyle career

High school 
During his high school wrestling years, Green compiled a 148–8 record and claimed All–State honors three times, winning the NJSIAA state championship out of Willingboro High School as a senior in 2011, becoming the first to do so in the history of the school. After his championship season, Green claimed the NHSCA Senior National championship before being recruited by the Nebraska Cornhuskers.

College 
In collegiate wrestling, Green went on to become a four–time NCAA Division I All–American (placing 7th, 7th, 3rd and 3rd) and a Big Ten Conference champion for the Cornhuskers, graduating in 2015 with a 124–18 record.

Freestyle career

2013–2016 
During 2013, his first year competing in senior freestyle, Green claimed the US University National championship, placing seventh at the Summer Universiade. In 2014, he made the move from 66 to 70 kilograms, and placed fifth at the US Open, became a two–time US University National champion, claimed the silver medal from the University World Championships and placed second at the US World Team Trials. In 2015, Green placed third at the US Nationals, claimed the Grand Prix of Spain while defeating recently crowned European Games silver medalist from Italy Frank Chamizo in the finale and made the US World Team, bringing a bronze medal from the World Championships.

During the 2016 Summer Olympic year, Green moved down to the Olympic weight class of 65 kilograms on the start of the year, and placed 17th at the Yasar Dogu International and second at the Pan American Continental Championships, before going 0–2 at the US Olympic Team Trials. Afterwards, Green moved up once again to his natural 70 kilogram class and went 4–0 at the World Cup, placed third at the Poland Open, once again grabbed the Grand Prix of Spain crown and made his second US World Team while defeating two–time NCAA champion Jordan Oliver, and finally placing seventh at the World Championships.

2017–2018 
Green opened up what would end up being the most successful year of his career so far with a 3–1 record at the 2017 World Cup. After that, he went on to start a 20–match win–streak, where he claimed the Ukrainian Memorial International title, the US Open National championship, the Pan American Continental Championship, made his third–straight US World Team and placed himself on top of the Grand Prix of Spain podium before competing at the World Championships, defeating three opponents to make the gold–medal match, where he was derailed by '15 World Champion from Italy Frank Chamizo to claim the silver medal.

In 2018, Green once again opened up with a 3–1 record at the World Cup, helping Team USA reach the gold–medal. Afterwards, he claimed his second Pan American Continental title (helping the US sweep through all team titles), slipped past Cuba's two–time Pan American champion Franklin Maren for charity at Beat the Streets and made his fourth–straight US World Team, placing thirteenth at the World Championships. Before the year ended, Green competed one more time and placed third at the Alans International in Russia.

2019–2020 
During his trip to Russia and Europe, Green also placed seventh at the prestigious Golden Grand Prix Ivan Yarygin 2019 in January. In his last tournament during the trip, he won bronze at the Dan Kolov – Nikola Petrov Memorial in Bulgaria. Green then went back to the United States, where after being upset in the US Open finale by Ryan Deakin, he downed recently crowned NCAA champion from Rutgers Anthony Ashnault for charity at Beat the Streets, ran through the US World Team Trials Challenge and defeated Deakin back–to–back in the rematches to make his fifth–straight US World Team. Afterwards, Green once again went overseas, placing eleventh at the Yasar Dogu International and the Aleksandr Medved Memorial, before his thirteenth–place finish at the World Championships.

During the 2020 Summer Olympic year, Green first intended to move up to 74 kilograms, but in his first tournament at the Matteo Pellicone Ranking Series, he was eliminated in the first round by technical fall. Green was then scheduled to compete at the US Olympic Team Trials, however, the event was postponed for the next year along with the Summer Olympics due to the rising COVID-19 pandemic. Green was able to compete once again in November, downing Iowa standout Alex Marinelli at the HWC Showdown Open. He then made the move down to 65 kilograms, competed at two of the series of events put on by FloWrestling, the RTC Cup and the Flo 8–man Challenge (150 pounds), where he racked up victories over the likes of U23 Cuban National champion Anthony Echemendia and multiple–time All–Americans Alec Pantaleo and Bryce Meredith, gave birth to a series with two–time Cadet World champion Yianni Diakomihalis and placed second at both tournaments.

2021 
After downing another Iowa standout in Pat Lugo at another event by FloWrestling, Green competed at the Grand Prix de France Henri Deglane, where after notable wins over multiple–time South American champion Agustín Destribats and reigning U23 World champion from Azerbaijan Turan Bayramov, he was defeated by reigning Pan American Continental champion Yianni Diakomihalis in their rubber match, claiming silver. Green ultimately went 0–1 at the US Olympic Team Trials, falling to '18 US Open National champion Joseph McKenna in the first round.

After his failed attempt at 65 kg, Green returned to his competitive weight, going back up to 70 kilograms and claiming the US Open National Championship, defeating Matteo Pellicone Ranking Series 2021 winner Alec Pantaleo in the finale. Green had then been determined the U.S. representative for the Pan American Continental Championships, but did not attend the tournament, being replaced by Pantaleo. Instead, he competed at the prestigious 2021 Poland Open on June 8, where after a dominant win over Alec Pantaleo, Oleksii Boruta and World Champion Zurabi Iakobishvili on route to the finals, Green was upset by his now rival Pantaleo, claiming the silver medal.

Green competed at the 2021 US World Team Trials on September 11–12, intending to represent the country at the World Championships a sixth time. He downed everyone on his way to the top of the podium, most notably two-time NCAA champion Jordan Oliver and NCAA All-American Ryan Deakin. As a result, he represented the United States at the 2021 World Championships on October 4 in Oslo, Norway.

After two dominant victories to make the quarterfinals, Green was eliminated by U23 World Champion Turan Bayramov in a close match, and as the Azerbaijani lost his next bout to eventual champion Magomedmurad Gadzhiev, Green ended up placing seventh.

2022 
In his last year, Green competed at the prestigious Golden Grand Prix Ivan Yarygin on January 28, but failed to place by losing to 2020 European Champion Kurban Shiraev. He bounced back by beating Dillon Williams on February 12 at Bout at the Ballpark. Green competed at the prestigious Yasar Dogu International on February 27, claiming a silver medal on the last tournament of his career.

On April 8, Green announced he would retire from the competitive side of the sport.

Coaching career 
After retiring from competing in freestyle on April 8, 2022, Green was named the National Freestyle Developmental Coach for USA Wrestling. On his first tournament as a coach, Green led Team USA to the 2022 U17 World Championship in freestyle.

Freestyle record

! colspan="7"| Freestyle Matches
|-
!  Res.
!  Record
!  Opponent
!  Score
!  Date
!  Event
!  Location
|-
! style=background:white colspan=7 |
|-
|Loss
|141–39
|align=left| Amir Mohammad Yazdani
|style="font-size:88%"|2–8
|style="font-size:88%" rowspan=4|February 27, 2022
|style="font-size:88%" rowspan=4|2022 Yasar Dogu International
|style="text-align:left;font-size:88%;" rowspan=4|
 Istanbul, Turkey
|-
|Win
|141–38
|align=left| Viktor Rassadin
|style="font-size:88%"|3–2
|-
|Win
|140–38
|align=left| Aliakbar Fazlikhalili
|style="font-size:88%"|TF 10–0
|-
|Win
|139–38
|align=left| Khanburged Gankhuyag
|style="font-size:88%"|TF 11–0
|-
|Win
|138–38
|align=left| Dillon Williams
|style="font-size:88%"|TF 10–0
|style="font-size:88%"|February 12, 2022
|style="font-size:88%"|2022 Bout at the Ballpark
|style="text-align:left;font-size:88%;"|
 Arlington, Texas
|-
! style=background:white colspan=7 |
|-
|Loss
|137–38
|align=left| Kurban Shiraev
|style="font-size:88%"|8–10
|style="font-size:88%"|January 28, 2022
|style="font-size:88%"|Golden Grand Prix Ivan Yarygin 2022
|style="text-align:left;font-size:88%;"| Krasnoyarsk, Russia
|-
! style=background:white colspan=7 |
|-
|Loss
|137–37
|align=left| Turan Bayramov
|style="font-size:88%"|5–6
|style="font-size:88%" rowspan=3|October 4, 2021
|style="font-size:88%" rowspan=3|2021 World Championships
|style="text-align:left;font-size:88%;" rowspan=3| Oslo, Norway
|-
|Win
|137–36
|align=left| Shamil Ustaev
|style="font-size:88%"|TF 10–0
|-
|Win
|136–36
|align=left| Lee Seung-chul
|style="font-size:88%"|TF 10–0
|-
! style=background:white colspan=7 |
|-
|Win
|135–36
|align=left| Ryan Deakin
|style="font-size:88%"|4–2
|style="font-size:88%" rowspan=2|September 12, 2021
|style="font-size:88%" rowspan=4|2021 US World Team Trials
|style="text-align:left;font-size:88%;" rowspan=4| Lincoln, Nebraska
|-
|Win
|134–36
|align=left| Ryan Deakin
|style="font-size:88%"|6–6
|-
|Win
|133–36
|align=left| Jordan Oliver
|style="font-size:88%"|6–4
|style="font-size:88%" rowspan=2|September 11, 2021
|-
|Win
|132–36
|align=left| Brock Mauller
|style="font-size:88%"|Fall
|-
! style=background:white colspan=7 |
|-
|Loss
|131–36
|align=left| Alec Pantaleo
|style="font-size:88%"|3–5
|style="font-size:88%" rowspan=4|June 8, 2021
|style="font-size:88%" rowspan=4|2021 Poland Open
|style="text-align:left;font-size:88%;" rowspan=4|
 Warsaw, Poland
|-
|Win
|131–35
|align=left| Zurabi Iakobishvili
|style="font-size:88%"|4–0
|-
|Win
|130–35
|align=left| Oleksii Boruta
|style="font-size:88%"|2–1
|-
|Win
|129–35
|align=left| Alec Pantaleo
|style="font-size:88%"|8–0
|-
! style=background:white colspan=7 |
|-
|Win
|128–35
|align=left| Alec Pantaleo
|style="font-size:88%"|7–2
|style="font-size:88%" rowspan=5|May 1–2, 2021
|style="font-size:88%" rowspan=5|2021 US Open National Championships
|style="text-align:left;font-size:88%;" rowspan=5| Coralville, Iowa
|-
|Win
|127–35
|align=left| Brayton Lee
|style="font-size:88%"|4–2
|-
|Win
|126–35
|align=left| Elroy Perkin
|style="font-size:88%"|TF 12–2
|-
|Win
|125–35
|align=left| Cameron Harrell
|style="font-size:88%"|TF 11–0
|-
|Win
|124–35
|align=left| Austin Braun
|style="font-size:88%"|TF 10–0
|-
! style=background:white colspan=7 |
|-
|Loss
|123–35
|align=left| Joey McKenna
|style="font-size:88%"|TF 1–12
|style="font-size:88%" |April 2–3, 2021
|style="font-size:88%" |2020 US Olympic Team Trials
|style="text-align:left;font-size:88%;" | Forth Worth, Texas
|-
! style=background:white colspan=7 | 
|-
|Loss
|123–34
|align=left| Yianni Diakomihalis
|style="font-size:88%"|0–5
|style="font-size:88%" rowspan=4|January 16, 2021
|style="font-size:88%" rowspan=4|Grand Prix de France Henri Deglane 2021
|style="text-align:left;font-size:88%;" rowspan=4|
 Nice, France
|-
|Win
|123–33
|align=left| Turan Bayramov
|style="font-size:88%"|2–0
|-
|Win
|122–33
|align=left| Agustín Destribats
|style="font-size:88%"|TF 11–0
|-
|Win
|121–33
|align=left| Marwane Yezza
|style="font-size:88%"|TF 12–1
|-
|Win
|120–33
|align=left| Pat Lugo
|style="font-size:88%"|3–2
|style="font-size:88%"|January 9, 2021
|style="font-size:88%"|FloWrestling: Mensah-Stock vs. Gray
|style="text-align:left;font-size:88%;"|
 Austin, Texas
|-
! style=background:white colspan=7 |
|-
|Loss
|119–33
|align=left| Bajrang Punia
|style="font-size:88%"|4–8
|style="font-size:88%" rowspan=3|December 18, 2020
|style="font-size:88%" rowspan=3|Flo 8-Man Challenge: 150 lbs
|style="text-align:left;font-size:88%;" rowspan=3|
 Austin, Texas
|-
|Win
|119–32
|align=left| Alec Pantaleo
|style="font-size:88%"|4–2
|-
|Win
|118–32
|align=left| Bryce Meredith
|style="font-size:88%"|TF 10–0
|-
! style=background:white colspan=7 |
|-
|Loss
|117–32
|align=left| Yianni Diakomihalis
|style="font-size:88%"|4–4
|style="font-size:88%" rowspan=4|December 4–5, 2020
|style="font-size:88%" rowspan=4|FloWrestling RTC Cup
|style="text-align:left;font-size:88%;" rowspan=4| Austin, Texas
|-
|Win
|117–31
|align=left| Brayton Lee
|style="font-size:88%"|TF 11–0
|-
|Loss
|116–31
|align=left| Yianni Diakomihalis
|style="font-size:88%"|3–3
|-
|Win
|116–30
|align=left| Anthony Echemendia
|style="font-size:88%"|TF 14–4
|-
|Win
|115–30
|align=left| Alex Marinelli
|style="font-size:88%"|5–4
|style="font-size:88%"|November 1, 2020
|style="font-size:88%"|HWC Showdown Open
|style="text-align:left;font-size:88%;" |
 Iowa City, Iowa
|-
! style=background:white colspan=7 | 
|-
|Loss
|114–30
|align=left| Yones Aliakbar Emamichoghaei
|style="font-size:88%"|TF 5–15
|style="font-size:88%"|January 15–18, 2020
|style="font-size:88%"|Matteo Pellicone Ranking Series 2020
|style="text-align:left;font-size:88%;" |
 Rome, Italy
|-
! style=background:white colspan=7 |
|-
|Loss
|114–29
|align=left| Khetag Tsabolov
|style="font-size:88%"|4–7
|style="font-size:88%" rowspan=4|December 7–8, 2019
|style="font-size:88%" rowspan=4|2019 Alans International
|style="text-align:left;font-size:88%;" rowspan=4| Vladikavkaz, Russia
|-
|Win
|114–28
|align=left| Sumiyabazar Zandanbud
|style="font-size:88%"|3–0
|-
|Win
|113–28
|align=left| Gadzhimurad Alikhmaev
|style="font-size:88%"|8–4
|-
|Win
|112–28
|align=left| Ali Muhammed Ovezmuradov
|style="font-size:88%"|TF 11–0
|-
! style=background:white colspan=7 |
|-
|Loss
|111–28
|align=left| Magomedmurad Gadzhiev
|style="font-size:88%"|3–4
|style="font-size:88%" rowspan=2|September 20, 2019
|style="font-size:88%" rowspan=2|2019 World Championships
|style="text-align:left;font-size:88%;" rowspan=2| Nur-Sultan, Kazakhstan
|-
|Win
|111–27
|align=left| Vincent De Marinis
|style="font-size:88%"|10–2
|-
! style=background:white colspan=7 | 
|-
|Loss
|110–27
|align=left| Ikhtiyor Navruzov
|style="font-size:88%"|6–8
|style="font-size:88%"|August 9–11, 2019
|style="font-size:88%"|2019 Aleksandr Medved Prizes
|style="text-align:left;font-size:88%;" |
 Minsk, Belarus
|-
! style=background:white colspan=7 | 
|-
|Loss
|110–26
|align=left| Haydar Yavuz
|style="font-size:88%"|2–4
|style="font-size:88%"|July 11–14, 2019
|style="font-size:88%"|2019 Yaşar Doğu International
|style="text-align:left;font-size:88%;" |
 Istanbul, Turkey
|-
! style=background:white colspan=7 |
|-
|Win
|110–25
|align=left| Ryan Deakin
|style="font-size:88%"|4–3
|style="font-size:88%" rowspan=2|June 14–15, 2019
|style="font-size:88%" rowspan=2|Final X: Lincoln
|style="text-align:left;font-size:88%;" rowspan=2| Lincoln, Nebraska
|-
|Win
|109-25
|align=left| Ryan Deakin
|style="font-size:88%"|TF 11–0
|-
|Win
|108–25
|align=left| Anthony Ashnault
|style="font-size:88%"|TF 10–0
|style="font-size:88%" rowspan=3|May 17–19, 2019
|style="font-size:88%" rowspan=3|2019 US World Team Trials Challenge
|style="text-align:left;font-size:88%;" rowspan=3| Raleigh, North Carolina
|-
|Win
|107–25
|align=left| Brandon Sorensen
|style="font-size:88%"|TF 10–0
|-
|Win
|106–25
|align=left| Mario Mason
|style="font-size:88%"|5–3
|-
|Win
|105–25
|align=left| Anthony Ashnault
|style="font-size:88%"|8–4
|style="font-size:88%"|May 6, 2019
|style="font-size:88%"|2019 Beat The Streets: Grapple at the Garden
|style="text-align:left;font-size:88%;" |
 New York City, New York
|-
! style=background:white colspan=7 |
|-
|Loss
|104–25
|align=left| Ryan Deakin
|style="font-size:88%"|6–8
|style="font-size:88%" rowspan=6|April 24–27, 2019
|style="font-size:88%" rowspan=6|2019 US Open National Championships
|style="text-align:left;font-size:88%;" rowspan=6| Las Vegas, Nevada
|-
|Win
|104–24
|align=left| Jason Nolf
|style="font-size:88%"|6–6
|-
|Win
|103–24
|align=left| Anthony Collica
|style="font-size:88%"|9–2
|-
|Win
|102–24
|align=left| Jeren Glosser
|style="font-size:88%"|7–0
|-
|Win
|101–24
|align=left| Wyatt Sheets
|style="font-size:88%"|TF 10–0
|-
|Win
|100–24
|align=left| Kyle Kintz
|style="font-size:88%"|TF 10–0
|-
! style=background:white colspan=7 |
|-
|Win
|99–24
|align=left| Haitem Dakhlaoui
|style="font-size:88%"|TF 12–2
|style="font-size:88%" rowspan=3|February 28 – March 3, 2019
|style="font-size:88%" rowspan=3|2019 Dan Kolov - Nikola Petrov International
|style="text-align:left;font-size:88%;" rowspan=3| Ruse, Bulgaria
|-
|Loss
|98–24
|align=left| Anzor Zakuev
|style="font-size:88%"|3–4
|-
|Win
|98–23
|align=left| Evghenii Volcov
|style="font-size:88%"|TF 10–0
|-
! style=background:white colspan=7 |
|-
|Loss
|97–23
|align=left| David Baev
|style="font-size:88%"|2–10
|style="font-size:88%" rowspan=2|January 26, 2019
|style="font-size:88%" rowspan=2|Golden Grand Prix Ivan Yarygin 2019
|style="text-align:left;font-size:88%;" rowspan=2| Krasnoyarsk, Russia
|-
|Win
|97–22
|align=left| Perman Hommadov
|style="font-size:88%"|TF 13–0
|-
! style=background:white colspan=7 |
|-
|Win
|96–22
|align=left| Alibek Akbaev
|style="font-size:88%"|5–3
|style="font-size:88%" rowspan=4|December 7–9, 2018
|style="font-size:88%" rowspan=4|2018 Alans International
|style="text-align:left;font-size:88%;" rowspan=4| Vladikavkaz, Russia
|-
|Loss
|95–22
|align=left| David Baev
|style="font-size:88%"|6–8
|-
|Win
|95–21
|align=left| Chermen Valiev
|style="font-size:88%"|3–3
|-
|Win
|94–21
|align=left| Saipulla Alibolatov
|style="font-size:88%"|5–4
|-
! style=background:white colspan=7 |
|-
|Loss
|93–21
|align=left| Bat-Erdeniin Byambadorj
|style="font-size:88%"|2–4
|style="font-size:88%" rowspan=2|October 22, 2018
|style="font-size:88%" rowspan=2|2018 World Championships
|style="text-align:left;font-size:88%;" rowspan=2| Budapest, Hungary
|-
|Win
|93–20
|align=left| Khadzhimurad Gadzhiyev
|style="font-size:88%"|6–5
|-
! style=background:white colspan=7 |
|-
|Win
|92–20
|align=left| Jason Chamberlain
|style="font-size:88%"|2–1
|style="font-size:88%" rowspan=2|June 8–9, 2018
|style="font-size:88%" rowspan=2|2018 Final X: Lincoln
|style="text-align:left;font-size:88%;" rowspan=2| Lincoln, Nebraska
|-
|Win
|91–20
|align=left| Jason Chamberlain
|style="font-size:88%"|2–0
|-
|Win
|90–20
|align=left| Franklin Maren
|style="font-size:88%"|2–1
|style="font-size:88%"|May 17, 2018
|style="font-size:88%"|2018 Beat The Streets: Team USA vs. The World All-Stars
|style="text-align:left;font-size:88%;" |
 New York City, New York
|-
! style=background:white colspan=7 |
|-
|Win
|89–20
|align=left| Hernán Guzmán Ipuz
|style="font-size:88%"|TF 10–0
|style="font-size:88%" rowspan=4|May 3–6, 2018
|style="font-size:88%" rowspan=4|2018 Pan American Continental Championships
|style="text-align:left;font-size:88%;" rowspan=4| Lima, Peru
|-
|Win
|88–20
|align=left| Marcos de Oliveira
|style="font-size:88%"|Fall
|-
|Win
|87–20
|align=left| Hernán Guzmán Ipuz
|style="font-size:88%"|TF 11–1
|-
|Win
|86–20
|align=left| Anthony Montero
|style="font-size:88%"|4–1
|-
! style=background:white colspan=7 |
|-
|Loss
|85–20
|align=left| Joshgun Azimov
|style="font-size:88%"|4–4
|style="font-size:88%" rowspan=4|April 7–8, 2018
|style="font-size:88%" rowspan=4|2018 World Cup
|style="text-align:left;font-size:88%;" rowspan=4| Iowa City, Iowa
|-
|Win
|85–19
|align=left| Levan Kelekhsashvili
|style="font-size:88%"|8–0
|-
|Win
|84–19
|align=left| Kirin Kinoshita
|style="font-size:88%"|8–5
|-
|Win
|83–19
|align=left| Arun Kumar
|style="font-size:88%"|TF 10–0
|-
! style=background:white colspan=7 |
|-
|Loss
|82–19
|align=left| Frank Chamizo
|style="font-size:88%"|0–8
|style="font-size:88%" rowspan=4|August 20–25, 2017
|style="font-size:88%" rowspan=4|2017 World Championships
|style="text-align:left;font-size:88%;" rowspan=4| Paris, France
|-
|Win
|82–18
|align=left| Yuhi Fujinami
|style="font-size:88%"|5–3
|-
|Win
|81–18
|align=left| Zurabi Erbotsonashvili
|style="font-size:88%"|3–2
|-
|Win
|80–18
|align=left| Néstor Tafur
|style="font-size:88%"|8–0
|-
! style=background:white colspan=7 |
|-
|Win
|79–18
|align=left| Zsombor Gulyas
|style="font-size:88%"|TF 11–0
|style="font-size:88%" rowspan=3|July 15–16, 2017
|style="font-size:88%" rowspan=3|2017 Grand Prix of Spain
|style="text-align:left;font-size:88%;" rowspan=3| Madrid, Spain
|-
|Win
|78–18
|align=left| Azamat Nurykau
|style="font-size:88%"|6–0
|-
|Win
|77–18
|align=left| Andruse Aimar
|style="font-size:88%"|TF 12–2
|-
! style=background:white colspan=7 |
|-
|Win
|76–18
|align=left| Jimmy Kennedy
|style="font-size:88%"|8–5
|style="font-size:88%" rowspan=2|June 9–10, 2017
|style="font-size:88%" rowspan=2|2017 US World Team Trials
|style="text-align:left;font-size:88%;" rowspan=2| Lincoln, Nebraska
|-
|Win
|75–18
|align=left| Jimmy Kennedy
|style="font-size:88%"|6–0
|-
! style=background:white colspan=7 |
|-
|Win
|74–18
|align=left| Luis Portillo Mejia
|style="font-size:88%"|TF 10–0
|style="font-size:88%" rowspan=4|May 5–7, 2017
|style="font-size:88%" rowspan=4|2017 Pan American Continental Championships
|style="text-align:left;font-size:88%;" rowspan=4| Salvador da Bahia, Brazil
|-
|Win
|73–18
|align=left| Lincoln Moreira dos Santos
|style="font-size:88%"|TF 10–0
|-
|Win
|72–18
|align=left| Julio Rodriguez Romero
|style="font-size:88%"|TF 10–0
|-
|Win
|71–18
|align=left| Mauricio Sánchez Saltos
|style="font-size:88%"|TF 10–0
|-
! style=background:white colspan=7 |
|-
|Win
|70–18
|align=left| Nazar Kulchytskyy
|style="font-size:88%"|4–1
|style="font-size:88%" rowspan=5|April 26–29, 2017
|style="font-size:88%" rowspan=5|2017 US Open National Championships
|style="text-align:left;font-size:88%;" rowspan=5| Las Vegas, Nevada
|-
|Win
|69–18
|align=left| Jason Nolf
|style="font-size:88%"|9–8
|-
|Win
|68–18
|align=left| Dylan Ness
|style="font-size:88%"|TF 11–0
|-
|Win
|67–18
|align=left| Jake Sueflohn
|style="font-size:88%"|TF 10–0
|-
|Win
|66–18
|align=left| Grant LaMont
|style="font-size:88%"|TF 10–0
|-
! style=background:white colspan=7 |
|-
|Win
|65–18
|align=left| Hamed Rashidi
|style="font-size:88%"|Fall
|style="font-size:88%" rowspan=3|March 3–4, 2017
|style="font-size:88%" rowspan=3|XXI Outstanding Ukrainian Wrestlers and Coaches Memorial
|style="text-align:left;font-size:88%;" rowspan=3| Kiev, Ukraine
|-
|Win
|64–18
|align=left| Azamat Nurykau
|style="font-size:88%"|5–3
|-
|Win
|63–18
|align=left| Surho Rashytkhanau
|style="font-size:88%"|7–6
|-
! style=background:white colspan=7 |
|-
|Loss
|62–18
|align=left| Mostafa Hosseinkhani
|style="font-size:88%"|0–2
|style="font-size:88%" rowspan=4|February 16–17, 2017
|style="font-size:88%" rowspan=4|2017 World Cup
|style="text-align:left;font-size:88%;" rowspan=4| Kermanshah, Iran
|-
|Win
|62–17
|align=left| David Suynyuchkhanov
|style="font-size:88%"|TF 10–0
|-
|Win
|61–17
|align=left| Magomedkhabib Kadimagomedov
|style="font-size:88%"|8–6
|-
|Win
|60–17
|align=left| Levan Kelekhsashvili
|style="font-size:88%"|TF 10–0
|-
! style=background:white colspan=7 |
|-
|Loss
|59–17
|align=left| Rashid Kurbanov
|style="font-size:88%"|3–3
|style="font-size:88%" rowspan=3|December 11, 2016
|style="font-size:88%" rowspan=3|2016 World Championships
|style="text-align:left;font-size:88%;" rowspan=3| Budapest, Hungary
|-
|Win
|59–16
|align=left| Davit Tlashadze
|style="font-size:88%"|4–1
|-
|Win
|58–16
|align=left| Gitinomagomed Gadzhiyev
|style="font-size:88%"|TF 12–1
|-
! style=background:white colspan=7 |
|-
|Win
|57–16
|align=left| Jordan Oliver
|style="font-size:88%"|4–3
|style="font-size:88%" rowspan=2|November 10–12, 2016
|style="font-size:88%" rowspan=2|2016 Bill Farrell Memorial International (US World Team Trials)
|style="text-align:left;font-size:88%;" rowspan=2| New York City, New York
|-
|Win
|56–16
|align=left| Jordan Oliver
|style="font-size:88%"|2–1
|-
! style=background:white colspan=7 |
|-
|Win
|55–16
|align=left| Ildus Giniyatullin
|style="font-size:88%"|4–3
|style="font-size:88%" rowspan=3|July 9–10, 2016
|style="font-size:88%" rowspan=3|2016 Grand Prix of Spain
|style="text-align:left;font-size:88%;" rowspan=3| Madrid, Spain
|-
|Win
|54–16
|align=left| Hamed Vafaei
|style="font-size:88%"|TF 10–0
|-
|Win
|53–16
|align=left| Kubilay Cakici
|style="font-size:88%"|7–5
|-
! style=background:white colspan=7 |
|-
|Win
|52–16
|align=left| Dauren Zhumagaziev
|style="font-size:88%"|10–4
|style="font-size:88%" rowspan=3|June 17–19, 2016
|style="font-size:88%" rowspan=3|2016 Poland Open
|style="text-align:left;font-size:88%;" rowspan=3| Spala, Poland
|-
|Loss
|51–16
|align=left| Ikhtiyor Navruzov
|style="font-size:88%"|8–10
|-
|Win
|51–15
|align=left| Zafer Dama
|style="font-size:88%"|3–0
|-
! style=background:white colspan=7 |
|-
|Win
|50–15
|align=left| Davit Tlashadze
|style="font-size:88%"|TF 10–0
|style="font-size:88%" rowspan=4|June 11–12, 2016
|style="font-size:88%" rowspan=4|2016 World Cup
|style="text-align:left;font-size:88%;" rowspan=4| Los Angeles, California
|-
|Win
|49–15
|align=left| Mostafa Hosseinkhani
|style="font-size:88%"|5–2
|-
|Win
|48–15
|align=left| Omarov Gadzhimurad
|style="font-size:88%"|TF 10–0
|-
|Win
|47–15
|align=left| Vinod Kumar Omprakash
|style="font-size:88%"|TF 10–0
|-
! style=background:white colspan=7 | 
|-
|Loss
|46–15
|align=left| Bernard Futrell
|style="font-size:88%"|4–8
|style="font-size:88%"rowspan=2|April 9, 2016
|style="font-size:88%"rowspan=2|2016 US Olympic Team Trials
|style="text-align:left;font-size:88%;" rowspan=2|
 Iowa City, Iowa
|-
|Loss
|46–14
|align=left| Zain Retherford
|style="font-size:88%"|2–9
|-
! style=background:white colspan=7 |
|-
|Loss
|46–13
|align=left| Anthony Montero
|style="font-size:88%"|6–10
|style="font-size:88%" rowspan=3|February 26–28, 2016
|style="font-size:88%" rowspan=3|2016 Pan American Continental Championships
|style="text-align:left;font-size:88%;" rowspan=3| Frisco, Texas
|-
|Win
|46–12
|align=left| Brandon Díaz
|style="font-size:88%"|3–2
|-
|Win
|45–12
|align=left| Dillon Williams
|style="font-size:88%"|TF 14–1
|-
! style=background:white colspan=7 |
|-
|Loss
|44–12
|align=left| Safa Aksoy
|style="font-size:88%" |2–2
|style="font-size:88%" |February 5–7, 2016
|style="font-size:88%" |2016 Yaşar Doğu International
|style="text-align:left;font-size:88%;" | Istanbul, Turkey
|-
! style=background:white colspan=7 |
|-
|Win
|44–11
|align=left| Miroslav Kirov
|style="font-size:88%"|Fall
|style="font-size:88%" rowspan=5|September 12, 2015
|style="font-size:88%" rowspan=5|2015 World Championships
|style="text-align:left;font-size:88%;" rowspan=5| Las Vegas, Nevada
|-
|Loss
|43–11
|align=left| Hassan Yazdani
|style="font-size:88%"|4–9
|-
|Win
|43–10
|align=left| Kamar Arun
|style="font-size:88%"|TF 10–0
|-
|Win
|42–10
|align=left| Robert Olle
|style="font-size:88%"|TF 12–1
|-
|Win
|41–10
|align=left| Johnathan Scott Duque
|style="font-size:88%"|TF 10–0
|-
! style=background:white colspan=7 |
|-
|Win
|40–10
|align=left| Nick Marable
|style="font-size:88%"|2–1
|style="font-size:88%" rowspan=2|July 25, 2015
|style="font-size:88%" rowspan=2|2015 US World Team Special Wrestle-off
|style="text-align:left;font-size:88%;" rowspan=2| Fargo, North Dakota
|-
|Win
|39–10
|align=left| Nick Marable
|style="font-size:88%"|4–0
|-
! style=background:white colspan=7 |
|-
|Win
|38–10
|align=left| Frank Chamizo
|style="font-size:88%"|5–5
|style="font-size:88%" rowspan=3|July 11, 2015
|style="font-size:88%" rowspan=3|2015 Grand Prix of Spain
|style="text-align:left;font-size:88%;" rowspan=3| Madrid, Spain
|-
|Win
|37–10
|align=left| Takojima Nobuyoshi
|style="font-size:88%"|7–0
|-
|Win
|36–10
|align=left| Alec Bauer
|style="font-size:88%"|TF 10–0
|-
|Win
|35–10
|align=left| Dustin Schlatter
|style="font-size:88%"|4–2
|style="font-size:88%" rowspan=4|June 12–14, 2015
|style="font-size:88%" rowspan=4|2015 US World Team Trials
|style="text-align:left;font-size:88%;" rowspan=4| Madison, Wisconsin
|-
|Win
|34–10
|align=left| Dustin Schlatter
|style="font-size:88%"|5–0
|-
|Win
|33–10
|align=left| Kevin LeValley
|style="font-size:88%"|TF 13–2
|-
|Win
|32–10
|align=left| Nazar Kulchytskyy
|style="font-size:88%"|9–7
|-
! style=background:white colspan=7 |
|-
|Win
|31–10
|align=left| Kevin LeValley
|style="font-size:88%"|TF 13–0
|style="font-size:88%" rowspan=7|May 7–9, 2015
|style="font-size:88%" rowspan=7|2015 US National Championships
|style="text-align:left;font-size:88%;" rowspan=7| Las Vegas, Nevada
|-
|Win
|30–10
|align=left| Moza Fay
|style="font-size:88%"|TF 15–4
|-
|Win
|29–10
|align=left| Adam Hall
|style="font-size:88%"|TF 10–0
|-
|Win
|28–10
|align=left| Mike Moreno
|style="font-size:88%"|TF 11–0
|-
|Loss
|27–10
|align=left| Kevin LeValley
|style="font-size:88%"|5–5
|-
|Win
|27–9
|align=left| Chase Nelson
|style="font-size:88%"|TF 13–2
|-
|Win
|26–9
|align=left| Connor Keating
|style="font-size:88%"|TF 12–2
|-
! style=background:white colspan=7 |
|-
|Loss
|25–9
|align=left| Nick Marable
|style="font-size:88%"|2-8
|style="font-size:88%" rowspan=5|July 18–24, 2014
|style="font-size:88%" rowspan=5|2013 US World Team Trials Phase II
|style="text-align:left;font-size:88%;" rowspan=5| Fargo, North Dakota
|-
|Loss
|25–8
|align=left| Nick Marable
|style="font-size:88%"|1–2
|-
|Win
|25–7
|align=left| Kyle Ruschell
|style="font-size:88%"|8–4
|-
|Win
|24–7
|align=left| Moza Fay
|style="font-size:88%"|5–4
|-
|Win
|23–7
|align=left| Chase Pami
|style="font-size:88%"|4–1
|-
! style=background:white colspan=7 |
|-
|Loss
|22–7
|align=left| Evgheni Nedealco
|style="font-size:88%"|Fall
|style="font-size:88%" rowspan=3|July 8–12, 2014
|style="font-size:88%" rowspan=3|2014 University World Championships
|style="text-align:left;font-size:88%;" rowspan=3| Pécs, Hungary
|-
|Win
|22–6
|align=left| Shamil Magomedov
|style="font-size:88%"|8–4
|-
|Win
|21–6
|align=left| Jere Kunnas
|style="font-size:88%"|11–5
|-
! style=background:white colspan=7 |
|-
|Win
|20–6
|align=left| Adam Hall
|style="font-size:88%"|4–2
|style="font-size:88%" rowspan=8|May 22–25, 2014
|style="font-size:88%" rowspan=8|2014 US University National Championships
|style="text-align:left;font-size:88%;" rowspan=8| Akron, Ohio
|-
|Win
|19–6
|align=left| Adam Hall
|style="font-size:88%"|4–1
|-
|Win
|18–6
|align=left| Steve Santos
|style="font-size:88%"|TF 11–0
|-
|Win
|17–6
|align=left| Josh Demas
|style="font-size:88%"|TF 11–0
|-
|Win
|16–6
|align=left| Chad Walsh
|style="font-size:88%"|TF 11–1
|-
|Win
|15–6
|align=left| Luke Blanton
|style="font-size:88%"|TF 12–0
|-
|Win
|14–6
|align=left| Brandon Nelsen
|style="font-size:88%"|TF 12–2
|-
|Win
|13–6
|align=left| Howell Clements
|style="font-size:88%"|Fall
|-
! style=background:white colspan=7 |
|-
|Loss
|12–6
|align=left| Kyle Ruschell
|style="font-size:88%"|5–8
|style="font-size:88%" rowspan=5|April 17–19, 2014
|style="font-size:88%" rowspan=5|2014 US Open National Championships
|style="text-align:left;font-size:88%;" rowspan=5| Las Vegas, Nevada
|-
|Loss
|12–5
|align=left| Nick Marable
|style="font-size:88%"|1–5
|-
|Win
|12–4
|align=left| Jason Welch
|style="font-size:88%"|10–10
|-
|Win
|11–4
|align=left| Chase Nelson
|style="font-size:88%"|9–8
|-
|Win
|10–4
|align=left| Devon Parrish
|style="font-size:88%"|TF 10–0
|-
! style=background:white colspan=7 | 
|-
|Loss
|9–4
|align=left| Ulukman Mamatov
|style="font-size:88%"|1–3
|style="font-size:88%" rowspan=2|July 11, 2013
|style="font-size:88%" rowspan=2|2013 Summer Universiade
|style="text-align:left;font-size:88%;" rowspan=2|
 Kazan, Russia
|-
|Win
|9–3
|align=left| Petteri Martikainen
|style="font-size:88%"|4–0
|-
! style=background:white colspan=7 |
|-
|Loss
|8–3
|align=left| Jason Chamberlain
|style="font-size:88%"|4–8
|style="font-size:88%" rowspan=2|June 21, 2013
|style="font-size:88%" rowspan=2|2013 US World Team Trials Challenge
|style="text-align:left;font-size:88%;" rowspan=2| Stillwater, Oklahoma
|-
|Loss
|8–2
|align=left| Drew Headlee
|style="font-size:88%"|Fall
|-
! style=background:white colspan=7 |
|-
|Win
|8–1
|align=left| Jason Chamberlain
|style="font-size:88%"|3–0
|style="font-size:88%" rowspan=9|May 24–26, 2013
|style="font-size:88%" rowspan=9|2013 US University National Championships
|style="text-align:left;font-size:88%;" rowspan=9| Akron, Ohio
|-
|Loss
|7–1
|align=left| Jason Chamberlain
|style="font-size:88%"|4–5
|-
|Win
|7–0
|align=left| Jason Chamberlain
|style="font-size:88%"|4–2
|-
|Win
|6–0
|align=left| Hunter Stieber
|style="font-size:88%"|Fall
|-
|Win
|5–0
|align=left| Nick Dardanes
|style="font-size:88%"|TF 13–2
|-
|Win
|4–0
|align=left| Zack Beitz
|style="font-size:88%"|TF 12–2
|-
|Win
|3–0
|align=left| Tyler Scotten
|style="font-size:88%"|TF 10–0
|-
|Win
|2–0
|align=left| Daniel White
|style="font-size:88%"|TF 10–0
|-
|Win
|1–0
|align=left| Zachary Stepan
|style="font-size:88%"|TF 10–0
|-

NCAA record 

! colspan="8"| NCAA Championships Matches
|-
!  Res.
!  Record
!  Opponent
!  Score
!  Date
!  Event
|-
! style=background:white colspan=6 | 2015 NCAA Championships  at 157 lbs
|-
|Win
|18–6
|align=left| Nick Brascetta
|style="font-size:88%"|3–2
|style="font-size:88%" rowspan=6|March 19–21, 2015
|style="font-size:88%" rowspan=6|2015 NCAA Division I National Championships
|-
|Win
|17–6
|align=left| Ian Miller
|style="font-size:88%"|MD 13–4
|-
|Loss
|16–6
|align=left| Isaiah Martinez
|style="font-size:88%"|2–3
|-
|Win
|16–5
|align=left| Mitchell Minott
|style="font-size:88%"|MD 12–4
|-
|Win
|15–5
|align=left| Noel Blanco
|style="font-size:88%"|TF 20–5
|-
|Win
|14–5
|align=left| Markus Scheidel
|style="font-size:88%"|MD 14–3
|-
! style=background:white colspan=6 | 2014 NCAA Championships  at 157 lbs
|-
|Win
|13–5
|align=left| Brian Realbuto
|style="font-size:88%"|MFF
|style="font-size:88%" rowspan=6|March 20–22, 2014
|style="font-size:88%" rowspan=6|2014 NCAA Division I National Championships
|-
|Win
|12–5
|align=left| Isaac Jordan
|style="font-size:88%"|TF 15–0
|-
|Win
|11–5
|align=left| Joey Lavallee
|style="font-size:88%"|MD 12–2
|-
|Loss
|10–5
|align=left| Jayson Ness
|style="font-size:88%"|Fall
|-
|Win
|10–4
|align=left| Zach Brunson
|style="font-size:88%"|MD 14–3
|-
|Win
|9–4
|align=left| Josh Kreimier
|style="font-size:88%"|MD 14–3
|-
! style=background:white colspan=6 | 2013 NCAA Championships 7th at 157 lbs
|-
|Win
|8–4
|align=left| James Fleming
|style="font-size:88%"|MD 14–4
|style="font-size:88%" rowspan=6|March 21–23, 2013
|style="font-size:88%" rowspan=6|2013 NCAA Division I National Championships
|-
|Loss
|7–4
|align=left| Jedd Moore
|style="font-size:88%"|Fall
|-
|Win
|7–3
|align=left| Dylan Alton
|style="font-size:88%"|MD 14–4
|-
|Win
|6–3
|align=left| Taylor Walsh
|style="font-size:88%"|MD 19–8
|-
|Win
|5–3
|align=left| Bobby Barnhisel
|style="font-size:88%"|TF 21–6
|-
|Loss
|4–3
|align=left| Kyle Bradley
|style="font-size:88%"|TB 5–6
|-
! style=background:white colspan=6 | 2012 NCAA Championships 7th at 157 lbs
|-
|Win
|4–2
|align=left| Walter Peppelman
|style="font-size:88%"|9–1
|style="font-size:88%" rowspan=6|March 15–17, 2012
|style="font-size:88%" rowspan=6|2012 NCAA Division I National Championships
|-
|Loss
|3–2
|align=left| Dylan Alton
|style="font-size:88%"|3–4
|-
|Win
|3–1
|align=left| Steve Monk
|style="font-size:88%"|3–1
|-
|Loss
|2–1
|align=left| Jason Welch
|style="font-size:88%"|1–2
|-
|Win
|2–0
|align=left| James Fleming
|style="font-size:88%"|OT 8–3
|-
|Win
|1–0
|align=left| Brian Tanen
|style="font-size:88%"|MD 16–7
|-

Stats 

!  Season
!  Year
!  School
!  Placement
!  Weigh Class
!  Record
!  Win
|-
|2015
|Senior
|rowspan=4|University of Nebraska
|3rd
|rowspan=4|157
|30–5
|85.71%
|-
|2014
|Junior
|3rd
|35–2
|94.60%
|-
|2013
|Sophomore
|7th
|25–6
|89.65%
|-
|2012
|Freshman
|7th
|34–5
|87.18%
|-
|colspan=5 bgcolor="LIGHTGREY"|Career
|bgcolor="LIGHTGREY"|124–18
|bgcolor="LIGHTGREY"|92.12%

References 

Living people
1992 births
American male sport wrestlers
World Wrestling Championships medalists
People from Willingboro Township, New Jersey
Sportspeople from Burlington County, New Jersey
Willingboro High School alumni
Nebraska Cornhuskers wrestlers
Pan American Wrestling Championships medalists
20th-century American people
21st-century American people